Samuel Huntington may refer to:

 Samuel Huntington (Connecticut politician) (1731–1796), American jurist, statesman, and revolutionary leader, 18th Governor of Connecticut
 Samuel Huntington (Ohio politician) (1765–1817), American jurist, third Governor of Ohio 
 Samuel P. Huntington (1927–2008), American political scientist and historian
 SS Samuel Huntington, an American liberty ship

See also
Sam Huntington (born 1982), American actor